Yamna is an extinct passeriform bird from early Oligocene deposits of Poland. It has been concluded as a frugivore or omnivore that lived in forests and shrubs.

References

Oligocene birds
Fossil taxa described in 2011
Prehistoric birds of Europe